The Joint Advisory Commission, Korea (JACK)(주한합동고문단) was a U.S. covert operations unit that participated in the Korean War.

Operating under the direction of the Central Intelligence Agency, JACK was responsible for inserting and extracting U.S.-trained Korean agents into North Korea, conducting covert maritime raids along the North Korean coast, and providing escape and evasion support for downed Air Force pilots.

Units
Yong-do Group (영도유격대) based in Yeongdo District, Busan was the main guerrilla unit.

See also
 Korea Liaison Office
 8240th Army Unit
 United Nations Partisan Infantry Korea
 Former United States special operations units
 Special Activities Division

References

External links
 JACK Operations & Activities

Central Intelligence Agency operations
Military units and formations of the Korean War
Military units and formations of South Korea in the Korean War
Military units and formations of the United States in the Korean War